T-Mac may refer to:

Tony MacAlpine (born 1960), American musician
Terry McAuliffe (born 1957), American politician
Tracy McGrady (born 1979), American former basketball player

See also
TMAC (disambiguation)